Radical 17 or radical open box is one of 23 of the 214 Kangxi radicals that are composed of 2 strokes.

 is also the 20th indexing component in the Table of Indexing Chinese Character Components predominantly adopted by Simplified Chinese dictionaries published in mainland China.

As for the similar radicals 22 匚 and 13 冂, the name of radical 17 is purely descriptive of its shape, 下三框 "lower three-sided frame".

Evolution

Derived characters

The radical does not occur as a character on its own. In combination, it historically takes meanings such as "open mouth", "box", "frame", "hole" or "receptacle".

Also derived from the radical are the Simplified Chinese characters including  "to hit", without any historical connection to the radical.

 "deep, dark" is derived from  radical 46 (山 "mountain") rather than radical 17.

Literature 

Leyi Li: “Tracing the Roots of Chinese Characters: 500 Cases”. Beijing 1993, 
 KangXi:  page 134, character 17

External links

Unihan Database - U+51F5

017
020